Corbu is a commune in Olt County, Muntenia, Romania. It is composed of five villages: Burdulești, Buzești, Ciurești, Corbu and Milcoveni.

In 2011, the population of Corbu commune was 2,458 inhabitants. 83.93% of the inhabitants are Romanians, and 12.94% of population belongs to Roma. The majority of inhabitants are Orthodox (96.75%).

References

Communes in Olt County
Localities in Muntenia